Demon Attack is a fixed shooter written by Rob Fulop for the Atari 2600 and published by Imagic in 1982. It was ported to the Intellivision, Magnavox Odyssey 2, Atari 8-bit family, VIC-20, Commodore 64, Tandy 1000 (as a self-booting disk), TRS-80, IBM PCjr, and TRS-80 Color Computer. There is also a port for the TI-99/4A titled Super Demon Attack.

Demon Attack is supposedly based on the 1979 arcade shooter Galaxian, though it closely resembles several waves from the 1980 arcade game Phoenix.  The similarities prompted a lawsuit from Atari, Inc., who had purchased the latter's home video game rights. Imagic settled out of court, and Demon Attack became Imagic's best-selling game as of 1983.

Gameplay

Marooned on the ice planet Krybor, the player uses a laser cannon to destroy legions of demons that attack from above. Visually, the demons appear in waves similar to other space-themed shooters, but individually combine from the sides of the screen to the area above the player's cannon.

Each wave introduces new weapons with which the demons attack, such as long streaming lasers and laser clusters. Starting in Wave 5, demons also divide into two smaller, bird-like creatures that eventually attempt descent onto the player's cannon. Starting in Wave 9, the demons' shots follow directly beneath the monsters, making it difficult for the player to slip underneath to get in a direct shot.

Development
The game was originally programmed to end after the 84th wave, as Fulop did not expect anyone to get so far. Two days after initial release however, the game was reported beaten. After the initial run of cartridges, Fulop went back and changed a single line of code so that the game never ends, but gets no harder.

The Odyssey 2 version was the first third-party game for the console.

Reception
Jan Yarnot reviewed the Atari version of Demon Attack in The Space Gamer No. 53. Yarnot commented that "This game is interesting and enjoyable, and different enough from other cartridges to recommend it for all who must 'play Atari today.'  The price is in line with other such programs and I think the fun of the game makes the price reasonable."

Video magazine reviewed the VCS version of Demon Attack in 1982, describing it as "quite simply excellent", and characterizing it as a "true coin-op-level program". Covering the game again in its 1982 Guide to Electronic Games, Video editors called the cartridge "a state-of-the-art invasion game" and suggested that its "slick graphics" represented "a quantum leap for the VCS". Computer and Video Games later reviewed the VCS version, giving it an 87% rating.

Video reserved higher praise for the Intellivision version of the game which was described as "even more thrilling graphically than the original VCS edition". Video Games praised the Intellivision version of the game, stating that "while the VCS version is a very good TV-game, this one is even better". Ahoy! called the VIC-20 version "excellent ... it's a super-grabber type of twitch game, and good for a few long nights".

Demon Attack won the 1983 Arcade Award for "Best Videogame of the Year", with the judges commenting that the game had "turned out to be yardstick against which gamers measured the quality of each new cartridge during 1982".

Legacy
Demon Attack was one of the most popular games to be released on the Atari 2600. It sold over 2 million copies, making it the third best selling game on the system that was not an arcade port behind Pitfall! and E.T.. Because of its success, a remake of the game has been announced for the Intellivision Amico.

References

External links
 
Demon Attack (Atari 2600) at Atari Mania
Demon Attack (Atari 8-bit family) at Atari Mania
Demon Attack (Intellivision) at INTV Funhouse
Demon Attack (C64) at gamebase 64
Super Demon Attack at TI-99/4A-Pedia

1982 video games
Atari 2600 games
Atari 8-bit family games
Commodore 64 games
Fixed shooters
Imagic games
Intellivision games
Multiplayer and single-player video games
Multiplayer hotseat games
TI-99/4A games
TRS-80 Color Computer games
TRS-80 games
VIC-20 games
Video games about demons
Video games developed in the United States
Video games set in outer space
Video games set on fictional planets
Magnavox Odyssey 2 games